Kristiine (Estonian for "Christina") is one of the 8 administrative districts of Tallinn, the capital of Estonia.

Kristiine is divided into 3 subdistricts:
Järve
Lilleküla
Tondi

The name of Kristiine originates from the Swedish Queen Christina under whose rule in 1653 the area was divided into 46 pieces (each of them 9 ha) and sold to businessmen and city officials for 100 riksdaler. The whole area was called  (Valley of Christina) and later Kristiine hayfield.

The elder of the district is Andrei Novikov (as of September 2013).

Population

Kristiine has a population of 31,739.

References

External links

Districts of Tallinn
Christina, Queen of Sweden